Luís Miguel de Olim Andrade (born 27 August 1981), known as Olim, is a Portuguese retired professional footballer. A versatile defender, he could play on either flank or in the middle.

Club career
After graduating from the youth academy at hometown's C.S. Marítimo in 2000, Funchal-born Olim spent his entire career with the Madeira club, but never managed to hold down a regular starting place. He made his Primeira Liga debut on 28 January 2001, playing 90 minutes in a 2–0 away loss against Gil Vicente FC, and finished his first season with the main squad with only three league appearances.

For the duration of his spell, Olim also appeared regularly with the B team in both the second and third divisions. He retired in June 2015, two months shy of his 34th birthday, being appointed assistant coach at precisely the reserves.

See also
List of one-club men

References

External links

1981 births
Living people
Sportspeople from Funchal
Portuguese footballers
Madeiran footballers
Association football defenders
Association football midfielders
Association football utility players
Primeira Liga players
Liga Portugal 2 players
Segunda Divisão players
C.S. Marítimo players
Portugal youth international footballers
Portuguese expatriate sportspeople in Lithuania